WMWA (96.5 FM) is an American radio station broadcasting a christian music radio format. Licensed to Malone, New York, United States, the station is currently owned by the Educational Media Foundation.

On June 28, 2021, Martz Communications Group announced that it was selling 94.7 WYUL Chateaugay and WVNV (which was broadcasting a country music format under the branding Wild Country 96-5) to the Educational Media Foundation (EMF), which runs K-Love and Air1, two Christian radio music formats. That would give EMF its first entry into the Greater Montreal, Canada's second-largest radio market, albeit on an American radio signal. The two stations also are heard in a section of Eastern Ontario, including the city of Cornwall. The sale, at a price of $2.5 million, was consummated on September 30, 2021. The station changed its call letters to WMWA on October 5, 2021.

References

External links

MWA
Radio stations established in 1993
1993 establishments in New York (state)
Educational Media Foundation radio stations
Air1 radio stations